Sacrificial Lambz is the eleventh studio album by Esham. Released in 2008, it is his first album since reviving Reel Life Productions and leaving Psychopathic Records.

Lyrical themes
Esham is quoted as saying "Sacrificial Lambz and my whole style and just the way that I rap has been a sacrifice to the industry. I feel like Sacrificial Lambz is like a gift to the industry and a gift to the consumer, whoever buys it. It’s actually a gift."

Reception

The album peaked at #50 on the Billboard Top Heatseekers chart and at #42 on the Top R&B/Hip-Hop Albums chart.

Track listing

Charts

References

2008 albums
Albums produced by Esham
Esham albums
Reel Life Productions albums